The Balkan terrapin or western Caspian terrapin (Mauremys rivulata) is a species of terrapin in the family Geoemydidae. It is found in the Balkan Peninsula (Albania, Bosnia and Herzegovina, Bulgaria, Croatia, North Macedonia, Montenegro, Serbia, Greece), a number of Mediterranean islands including Crete, Lesvos and Cyprus, and in the Middle East (Israel, Jordan, Lebanon, Syria, Turkey).

References 

Bibliography
 

Mauremys
Turtles of Asia
Turtles of Europe
Reptiles of Cyprus
Reptiles of Syria
Reptiles of Turkey
Reptiles described in 1833
Taxa named by Achille Valenciennes